Gul Muhammad Khan (born 1 December 1925, date of death unknown) was a Pakistani judge who served as the 4th chief justice of the Federal Shariat Court from 8 November 1984 to 8 November 1990 and Lahore High Court judge from 2 October 1974 to 8 November 1984.

Biography 
Khan was born in Jhang District, British India. He obtained his Bachelor of laws from the University of the Punjab in 1955 and bar from The Honourable Society of Lincoln's Inn in 1959.

Khan began his legal practice in 1960 at Lahore High Court and was appointed its judge on 2 October 1974. He retired from legal services on 8 November 1990. Khan is deceased.

References 

1925 births
Year of death missing
Chief justices of the Federal Shariat Court
Judges of the Lahore High Court
Punjab University Law College alumni
People from Jhang District